Marco Cornaro (1482 – 24 July 1524) (called Cardinal Cornaro and Cardinal Cornelius) was an Italian Roman Catholic cardinal and bishop.

Biography

A member of the House of Cornaro, Marco Cornaro was born in Venice in 1482, the son of Giorgio Cornaro and Elisabetta Morosini.  He was the nephew of Catherine Cornaro, Queen of Cyprus. He was ordained a priest by Pope Clement VII. His older brother Francesco Cornaro was also a cardinal.  Early in his life, Marco Cornaro was a protonotary apostolic.

Pope Alexander VI made Cornaro a cardinal deacon in the consistory of 28 September 1500.  He received the deaconry of Santa Maria in Campitelli on 5 October 1500.

He arrived in Rome on 1 September 1503 and then participated in both the papal conclave of September 1503 that elected Pope Pius III, and the papal conclave of October 1503 that elected Pope Julius II.

On 29 November 1503 he became apostolic administrator of the see of Verona, occupying this post to his death.  He was elected Bishop of Famagusta on 11 December 1503; he resigned this see on 1 July 1504.  In July 1506, he was named titular Latin Patriarch of Constantinople, holding this see until 30 October 1507, and then again from 11 June 1521 until his death.  In January 1511, he accompanied Pope Julius II during the siege of Mirandola.  The pope then named him papal legate to the Patrimonium Sancti Petri, holding this position until 1514.  He was also involved in the negotiations to reconcile the Republic of Venice with Pope Julius II.

He participated in the papal conclave of 1513 that elected Pope Leo X.  On 19 March 1513 he opted for the deaconry of Santa Maria in Via Lata.

During the Fifth Council of the Lateran, he served on the Commission of Reform.

He became a canon of Treviso Cathedral on 23 April 1513.  On 11 December 1513 he became chancellor of the metropolitan see of Nicosia.  On 4 April 1514, he was elected Bishop of Nemosia; he resigned this see on 22 March 1516.  On 9 March 1517 he became Bishop of Padua, occupying that see until his death.  On 4 November 1517 he became a member of the commission of cardinals on war with the Ottoman Empire.  He became administrator of the see of Nardò and legate to the Patrimonium Sancti Petri on 24 January 1519, holding this office until 20 February 1521.

He became cardinal protodeacon on 20 December 1520.  He participated in the papal conclave of 1521–22 that elected Pope Adrian VI.  As cardinal protodeacon, he announced Adrian VI's election to the people of Rome on 9 January 1522 and crowned the pope in the papal coronation held in St. Peter's Basilica on 31 January 1522.

He participated in the papal conclave of 1523 that elected Pope Clement VII.  As cardinal protodeacon, he crowned the new pope on 26 November 1523.  Cardinal Cornaro was one of three cardinals whom the new pope named to inquire about the Lutherans.

On 14 December 1523 he opted for the order of cardinal priests and the titular church of San Marco.  On 20 May 1524 he opted for the order of cardinal bishops and the Suburbicarian Diocese of Albano.  He opted for the Suburbicarian Diocese of Palestrina on 15 June 1524.

He died in Venice on 24 July 1524.  He was initially buried in the Church of San Giorgio Maggiore.  In 1570, his remains, along with those of the other cardinals of his family, were transferred to St Mark's Basilica.

References

1482 births
1524 deaths
16th-century Italian cardinals
Cardinals created by Pope Alexander VI
Latin Patriarchs of Constantinople
Marco
16th-century Roman Catholic bishops in the Republic of Venice